Všeobecné spiknutí is a Czech psychological novel by Egon Hostovský. It was written in 1961 in New York, USA and published in 1973 in Toronto, Canada. However, it was enough to be published in Czech in 1969 by the Melantrich publishing house in Prague. It is a psychological novel whose narrator is an insecure hero who stumbles between reality and his imagination. The novel deals with the feelings of a Czech emigrant in New York, who has feelings of uprootedness, is haunted by a sense of guilt, misses home and, moreover, takes stock of his life after his 40th birthday. His inner state is very complex and he loses himself in society and in himself. He tries to find the truth and answers, which he eventually finds in his childhood.

1969 Czech novels
Psychological novels